Yurajcocha (possibly from Quechua yuraq white, qucha lake, "white lake"), Tintayari or Huampuni (possibly from Aymara wampu boat, -ni, a suffix, "the one with a boat") is a lake in Peru located in the Junín Region, Huancayo Province, Chongos Alto District. Yurajcocha lies north of Acchicocha and northeast of Huichicocha. The lake belongs to the watershed of the Mantaro River. 

It is operated by Electroperu.

References 

Lakes of Peru
Lakes of Junín Region
Dams in Peru
Buildings and structures in Junín Region